Pirəkəşkül-Qobustan is a municipality in the Absheron Rayon of Azerbaijan. It has a population of 1,967.  The municipality consists of the villages of Pirəkəşkül and Qobustan.

References

Populated places in Absheron District